is a train station in Ikoma, Nara Prefecture, Japan.

Lines 
Kintetsu Railway
Ikoma Line

Platform

Around the Station
 
 Price cut
 Kinki University Nara Hospital

Adjacent stations 

Railway stations in Japan opened in 1927
Railway stations in Nara Prefecture